Jakarta Aquarium and Safari is a marine and freshwater aquarium located within a retail and leisure complex Neo Soho in Jakarta, Indonesia. The aquarium is home to hundreds of mammal, reptile, insect and various types of Indonesian marine fish, is to introduce to the next generation the biodiversity of the archipelago starting from islands, forests, and mangroves.

Other than Indonesian endemic animals, there are also animals from Africa and South America. The aquarium is a subsidiary of Taman Safari of Indonesia in collaboration with Aquaria KLCC of Malaysia. The Aquarium has received the accolade of Trip Advisor's Certificate of Excellence Destination 2018 and Indonesia Travel Tourism Awards (ITTA).

Zones 
The aquarium have nine zones, which displays various species.

Diving Deep

Soft coral tank 
 Bowtie damselfish
 Yellowtail damselfish
 Ocellaris clownfish
 Speckled sandperch

Anemone tank 
 Bluestreak cleaner wrasse
 Rockmover wrasse
 Tomato clownfish
 Nosestripe anemonefish
 Clark's anemonefish

Hard coral tank 
 Banded cleaner shrimp
 Yellowtail damselfish
 Sailfin tang
 Pacific regal blue tang

Islands of Indonesia

Otter exhibit 
 Asian small-clawed otter

Serval exhibit 
 Denison barb
 Nile tilapia
 Koi
 Serval

Rainforest of Indonesia 
Guests can took a picture with a blue-and-yellow macaw and an reticulated python. An interactive booth is also present, where guests can touch a Madagascar hissing cockroaches and red-eyed crocodile skinks. Special exhibits are also present, with Forsten's tortoises, Indonesian blue-tongued skinks, and an red tegu that can be petted by guests.

Squirrel exhibit 
 Prevost's squirrel

Owl house 
 Pacific barn owl

Iguana exhibit 
 Green iguana

Axolotl tank 
 Axolotl

Insectarium 
 Mexican redknee tarantula
 Asian forest scorpion

Paludarium 
 Blind cave fish
 Peters's elephantnose fish

Snake-necked turtle exhibit 
 Climbing perch
 Three spot gourami
 Northern snake-necked turtle

Poison dart frog exhibit 
 Golfodulcean poison frog
 Blue poison dart frog
 Dyeing poison dart frog

Agamid lizard exhibit 
 Chameleon forest dragon

Meerkat exhibit 
 Meerkat

Binturong exhibit 
 Javan binturong

Capuchin exhibit 
 Tufted capuchin

Insectarium and Herpetarium 
 Sumatran stick insect
 Leopard gecko
 Emerald green skink
 Australian green tree frog
 Malaysian orchid mantis

Nursery of the Sea

Mangrove tank 
 Black sea cucumber
 Mangrove horseshoe crab
 Banded archerfish

Seashore tank 

 Live sharksucker
 Silver moonyfish
 Crescent banded grunter
 Barred flagtail
 Milkfish
 Spotted sicklefish
 Snubnose pompano
 Cobia
 Flapnose ray
 Ocellated eagle ray
 Cowtail stingray
 Jenkins' whipray
 Mangrove whipray
 Common shovelnose ray

Shallow tank 
 Mangrove horseshoe crab
 Bluespotted ribbontail ray
 Bristle-tail filefish
 Milkfish
 Whitespotted bamboo shark
 Brownbanded bamboo shark

Swirls and Jewels

Cylindral tank 
 Indo-Pacific tarpon

Outer reef tank 

 Indo-Pacific sergeant
 Redbelly yellowtail fusilier
 Sailfin tang
 Orange-spine unicornfish
 Latticed butterflyfish
 Pennant coralfish
 Foxface rabbitfish
 Redcoat
 Barred soapfish
 Talang queenfish
 John's snapper
 Dusky batfish
 Laced moray

Sea urchin tank 
 Long-spined sea urchin
 Gilbert's cardinalfish
 Banggai cardinalfish
 Latticed butterflyfish

Coral reef tank 
 Picturesque dragonet
 Threespot dascyllus
 Maroon clownfish
 Flame angelfish

Shrimp tank 
 Squat shrimp
 Ocellaris clownfish
 Messmate pipefish
 Yellowbanded pipefish

Eeltail catfish tank 
 Striped eel catfish

Batfish tank 
 Spotted hawkfish
 Ribbon eel
 White ribbon eel
 Dusky batfish

Sea horse tank 
 Sand sifting starfish
 Tiger tail seahorse
 Alligator pipefish

Moray eel tank 
 Snowflake moray
 Zebra moray
 Barred moray

Circular tank 
Guests can enter a hollow space in the middle of the tank through a tunnel where they have to crawl in.
 Spotted-gill cardinalfish
 Pacific regal blue tang
 Dark-banded fusilier
 Emperor angelfish

Garden eel tank 
 Splendid garden eel
 Spotted garden eel
 Banded pipefish
 Razorfish

Lionfish tank 
 Milk-spotted pufferfish
 Clearfin lionfish
 Common lionfish
 Estuarine stonefish

Seadragon tank 
 Weedy seadragon

Touch and Find 
Guest could touch several species of fishes and starfish in the touch pool, such as chocolate chip sea star, bluespotted ribbontail ray, whitespotted bamboo shark, and brownbanded bamboo shark. An aquarium is also present containing bamboo shark eggs, where guest can learn about the shark's embryo development.

Threadfish tank 
 Torpedo scad
 Indian threadfish

Seafloor tank 
 Giant isopod

Spiny lobster tank 
 Scalloped spiny lobster

Cardinalfish tank 
 Blue bat star
 Half-barred cardinal
 Spotted-gill cardinalfish
 Pajama cardinalfish

River of Indonesia

Paludarium 
 Black tetra
 Rosy barb
 Freshwater angelfish
 Hybrid cichlid (Blood parrot cichlid x convict cichlid)

Waterfall tank 
 Amazon sailfin catfish
 Redtail catfish
 Hybrid catfish (Tiger sorubim x redtail catfish)
 Tucanare peacock bass
 Blue peacock bass
 Jullien's golden carp
 Giant gourami
 Pirapitinga
 Silver arowana
 Asian arowana
 Great tapah

Sturgeon tank 
 Amazon sailfin catfish
 Saddled bichir
 Bala shark
 Tinfoil barb
 Hampala barb
 Malayan mahseer
 Iridescent shark
 Siberian sturgeon
 Pig-nosed turtle
 Malaysian giant turtle

Tigerfish tank 
 Bigtooth river stingray
 Florida gar
 Payara
 Goliath tigerfish

Piranha Cave 
 Red-bellied piranha

Jellyfish Magic 
 White-spotted jellyfish
 Indonesian sea nettle

The zone also include an tank for upside-down jellyfish, torpedo scad, and Indian threadfish. Two deep sea-themed tanks is also present, one is for eyelight fish and popeye catalufas, while the second is for longspine snipefish and Japanese pineapplefish.

Southern Sea 

 Streaked spinefoot
 Orange-band surgeonfish
 Yellowfin surgeonfish
 Snubnose pompano
 Golden trevally
 Giant trevally
 Brown-marbled grouper
 Ocellated eagle ray
 Cowtail stingray
 Reticulate whipray
 Common shovelnose ray
 Zebra shark
 Tawny nurse shark
 Whitetip reef shark
 Blacktip reef shark
 Green sea turtle

Pingoo Restaurant 
Located next to the aquarium's exit and gift shop, Pingoo is a seafood and grill restaurant where guests can enjoy their meal and beverages with a group of Humboldt penguin.

See also

 Sea World Jakarta

References

Aquaria in Indonesia
Tourist attractions in Jakarta
2017 establishments in Indonesia